Gettin' Into Somethin is an album by jazz drummer Dave Bailey which was originally released on the Epic label in 1961.

Reception

AllMusic reviewer Ken Dryden described it as it a "first-rate record".

Track listing 
 "Slop Jah" (Clark Terry) - 8:30   
 "Little Old Mongoose" (Clark Terry, Archie Moore) - 6:26   
 "Evad Smurd" (Clark Terry) - 3:46   
 "Blues for J. P." (Horace Parlan) - 17:19

Personnel 
Dave Bailey - drums
Clark Terry - trumpet, flugelhorn
Curtis Fuller - trombone
Charlie Rouse - tenor saxophone
Horace Parlan - piano
Peck Morrison - bass

References 

Dave Bailey (musician) albums
1961 albums
Epic Records albums